The men's 10 metre platform competition at 2013 World Aquatics Championships was held on July 27 with the preliminary round and semifinal and the final on July 28.

Results
The preliminary round was held on July 27 at 10:00 and the semifinal at 14:00 with the final on July 28 at 14:00.

Green denotes finalists

Blue denotes semifinalists

References

Men's 10 m platform